Illusion is the first release of the Washington-based band Poor Moon. It was released by Sub Pop on March 27, 2012.

Track listing

External links
Illusion on Sub Pop

References

2012 EPs
Poor Moon albums
Sub Pop EPs